George W. Merrill (June 26, 1837 – January 10, 1914) was an American politician of the 19th century. He was born in Turner, Maine.

Merrill was District Attorney of Nye County, Nevada from 1864 to 1868.

On April 2, 1885, Merrill was appointed U.S. Minister Resident (similar to modern-day ambassador)  to the Kingdom of Hawaii.  He presented his credentials on June 12, 1885, and was recalled on September 23, 1889.
He replaced Rollin M. Daggett, and was replaced by John L. Stevens. He later worked in San Francisco, California as a lawyer. He died there of an illness of seven weeks on January 10, 1914, aged 76.

References

External links
 The Political Graveyard: Merrill

1837 births
1914 deaths
Ambassadors of the United States to Hawaii
Nevada lawyers
District attorneys in Nevada
19th-century American politicians
19th-century American lawyers